Heisson is an unincorporated community in Clark County, Washington.

Heisson lies just north of Battle Ground Lake State Park, south of the East Fork Lewis River, and northeast of Battle Ground, Washington. It consists of a combined general store and post office, along with several houses. Among these houses is the Henry Heisen House, which is listed on the National Register of Historic Places listings in Clark County, Washington. The post office is located adjacent to a crossing for the historic Chelatchie Prairie Railroad.

History
The area was named after German immigrant Alexander Heisen, and the "Heisson" spelling commonly used today is considered by some to be in error. Heisen and his family homesteaded in the area in 1866. The post office was founded in 1904, and Heisen granted land to the government for logging in exchange for having the post office named after him. However, the postal service recorded the name as "Heisson," and it was recorded as thus on maps. Only the railroad retained use of the "Heisen" spelling. Current general store and post office signage, as well as current maps, use the modified spelling.

Heisen's son built a home in the area, which is known as the Henry Heisen House and is listed on the National Register of Historic Places. The house is currently owned by Heisen House Vineyards.

The town flourished until 1923, when the timber was depleted and workers from the Ryan and Allen Mill, located across the East Fork Lewis River, began to move away.

References

Unincorporated communities in Clark County, Washington
Unincorporated communities in Washington (state)